Vellanki is a village located in Krishna district in the state of Andhra Pradesh, India.

Demographics 

The population of Vellanki is 2887 as per 2011 census of India. Literacy level is 58% and agricultural labor is 40% of total population of the village.

References 

Villages in Krishna district